Qinggang County is a county of western Heilongjiang province, People's Republic of China. It is under the jurisdiction of the prefecture-level city of Suihua.

Administrative divisions 
Qinggang County is divided into 4 subdistricts, 12 towns and 3 townships. 
4 subdistricts
 Beicheng, Xicheng, Jingcheng, Dongcheng
12 towns
 Qinggang, Zhonghe, Zhenxiang, Xinghua, Yongfeng, Luhe, Minzheng, Zhagang, Laodong, Yingchun, Desheng, Changsheng
3 townships
 Jianshe, Xincun, Lianfeng

Demographics 

Climate

References

External links 
  Government site - 

Qinggang
Suihua